Area code 504 is a telephone area code that covers greater New Orleans, Louisiana. Besides New Orleans itself (Orleans Parish), it includes all of St. Bernard and Plaquemines parishes and most of Jefferson Parish.

504 was one of the original area codes created in 1947, and originally covered all of Louisiana. In 1957, most of the state west of the Mississippi River was split off as area code 318. In 1998, the western portion of the old 504 territory, including Baton Rouge, became area code 225. In 2001, much of southeastern Louisiana was split off as area code 985, to both the west and the north of 504.

Several of New Orleans' downriver suburbs switched to 985 in 2001 as well. However, much of this area switched back to 504 in 2007. These communities are now being served with dialtone from telephone switching facilities in New Orleans following near-total destruction of local switching facilities due to flooding from Hurricane Katrina. Permissive dialing of 504 alongside 985 in this area began on July 29, 2007. Mandatory use of 504 to again reach these communities began on May 1, 2008. These communities are on both sides of the Mississippi River in lower Plaquemines Parish, including Pointe à la Hache on the east bank, with Port Sulphur, Buras, and Boothville on the west bank.

Prior to October 2021, area code 504 had telephone numbers assigned for the central office code 988. In 2020, 988 was designated nationwide as a dialing code for the National Suicide Prevention Lifeline, which created a conflict for exchanges that permit seven-digit dialing. This area code was therefore scheduled to transition to ten-digit dialing by October 24, 2021.

Popular culture
The area code inspired the name for the local jazz record label 504 Records, as well as the rap group 504 Boyz and the Old 97's song "504" on Hitchhike to Rhome. Rapper 504, who has heritage in New Orleans, uses this as his stage name as well. Also the area code 504 was mentioned in Drake's hit song "Practice", from his album Take Care. It has also been mentioned by Lil' Wayne due to his upbringing in the 504, specifically Hollygrove. The Soul Rebels also have a song called "504" about their hometown on their 2012 EP, Unlock Your Mind.

On Monday Night Football on December 16, 2019, New Orleans Saints quarterback Drew Brees threw his 540th career touchdown pass, breaking Peyton Manning’s record for most career touchdown passes in NFL history. When Brees broke the record, announcer Joe Tessitore said “540 in the 504!”, referencing the area code.

See also
List of Louisiana area codes

References

External links
 Area Code 504 Location – AreaCodeGoldmine.com/504
 NANPA: Louisiana area code map
 List of exchanges from AreaCodeDownload.com, 504 Area Code

504
Area codes in the New Orleans metropolitan area
504
Telecommunications-related introductions in 1947